This is a list of schools in East Sussex, England.

State-funded schools

Primary schools

Alfriston School, Alfriston
All Saints' and St Richard's CE Primary School, Old Heathfield
All Saints CE Junior Academy, Hastings
All Saints CE Primary School, Sidley
Annecy RC Primary School, Seaford
Ark Blacklands Primary Academy, Hastings
Ark Castledown Primary Academy, Hastings
Ark Little Ridge Primary Academy, St Leonards-on-Sea
Ashdown Primary School, Crowborough
The Baird Primary Academy, Hastings
Barcombe CE Primary School, Barcombe Cross
Battle and Langton CE Primary School, Battle
Beckley CE Primary School, Beckley
Blackboys CofE Primary School, Blackboys
Bodiam CE Primary School, Bodiam
Bonners CE School, Maresfield 
Bourne Primary School, Eastbourne
Breakwater Academy, Newhaven
Brede Primary School, Brede
Burfield Academy, Hailsham 
Burwash CE School, Burwash
Buxted CE Primary School, Buxted
Catsfield CE Primary School  Catsfield
The Cavendish School, Eastbourne
Chailey St Peter's CE Primary School, North Chailey
Chantry Community Primary School, Bexhill-on-Sea
Chiddingly Primary School, Chiddingly
Christ Church CE Primary Academy, St Leonards-on-Sea
Churchwood Primary Academy, St Leonards-on-Sea
Chyngton School, Seaford
Cradle Hill Community Primary School, Seaford
Cross-in-Hand CE Primary Schooll, Cross In Hand
Crowhurst CE Primary School, Crowhurst 
Dallington CE Primary School, Dallington
Danehill CE Primary School, Danehill 
Denton Community Primary School, Denton
Ditchling St Margaret's CE Primary School, Ditchling
Dudley Infant Academy, Hastings
East Hoathly CE Primary School, East Hoathly
Etchingham CE Primary School, Etchingham 
Firle CE Primary School, Firle 
Five Ashes CE Primary School, Five Ashes 
Fletching CE Primary School, Fletching 
Forest Row CE Primary School, Forest Row
Framfield CE Primary School, Framfield 
Frant CE Primary School, Frant
Gildredge House Free School, Eastbourne
Glenleigh Park Primary Academy, Bexhill-on-Sea
Groombridge St Thomas' CE Primary School, Groombridge 
Grovelands Community Primary School, Hailsham 
Guestling-Bradshaw CE Primary School, Guestling 
Hailsham Community College, Hailsham
Hamsey Community Primary School, Lewes
Hankham Primary School, Hankham
Harbour Primary School and Nursery, Newhaven
Harlands Primary School, Uckfield
The Haven CE/Methodist Primary School, Eastbourne
Hawkes Farm Academy, Hailsham
Hellingly Community Primary School, Hellingly
Heron Park Primary Academy, Eastbourne
Herstmonceux CE Primary School, Herstmonceux
High Cliff Academy, Newhaven 
High Hurstwood CE Primary School, High Hurstwood
Hollington Primary Academy, St Leonards-on-Sea
Holy Cross CE Primary School, Uckfield
Hurst Green CE Primary School, Hurst Green
Icklesham CE Primary School, Icklesham
Iford and Kingston CE Primary School, Kingston
Jarvis Brook Primary School, Jarvis Brook 
King Offa Primary Academy, Bexhill-on-Sea
Langney Primary Academy, Eastbourne
Laughton Community Primary School, Laughton
Little Common School, Bexhill-on-Sea
Little Horsted CE Primary School, Little Horsted
Manor Primary School, Uckfield 
Mark Cross CE Primary School, Mark Cross
Mayfield CE Primary School, Mayfield
Maynard's Green Community Primary School, Maynard's Green 
Meridian Community Primary School, Peacehaven
Motcombe Infants' School, Eastbourne
Netherfield CE Primary School, Netherfield
Newick CE Primary School, Newick
Ninfield CE Primary School, Ninfield
Northiam CE Primary School, Northiam 
Nutley CE Primary School, Nutley
Oakwood Primary Academy, Eastbourne
Ocklynge Junior School, Eastbourne
Ore Village Primary Academy, Hastings
Park Mead Primary School, Upper Dicker
Parkland Infant School, Eastbourne
Parkland Junior School, Eastbourne
Parkside Community Primary School, Heathfield
Pashley Down Infant School, Eastbourne
Peacehaven Heights Academy, Peacehaven
Peasmarsh CE Primary School, Peasmarsh 
Pebsham Primary Academy, Pebsham
Pevensey and Westham CE Primary School, Westham
Phoenix Academy, Hailsham
Plumpton Primary School, Plumpton Green
Polegate Primary School, Eastbourne 
Punnett's Town Community Primary School, Punnett's Town
Ringmer Primary School, Ringmer
Robsack Wood Primary Academy, St Leonards-on-Sea
Rocks Park Primary School, Uckfield 
Roselands Infants' School, Eastbourne
Rotherfield Primary School, Rotherfield 
Rye Community Primary School, Rye
Sacred Heart RC Primary School, Hastings
St Andrew's CE Infants School, Eastbourne
St John's CE Primary School, St John's
St John's Meads CE Primary School, Eastbourne
St Leonards CE Primary Academy, St Leonards-On-Sea
St Mark's CE Primary School, Hadlow Down 
St Mary Magdalene's RC Primary School, Bexhill-on-Sea
St Mary Star of the Sea RC Primary School, St Leonards-On-Sea
St Mary the Virgin CE Primary School, Hartfield 
St Marys RC Primary School, Crowborough
St Michael's CE Primary School, Playden 
St Michael's Primary School, Withyham 
St Pancras RC Primary School, Lewes
St Paul's CE Academy, St Leonards-On-Sea 
St Peter & St Paul CE Primary School, Bexhill-on-Sea
St Philip's RC Primary School, Uckfield 
St Thomas a Becket Catholic Primary School, Eastbourne
St Thomas' CE Primary School, Winchelsea
Salehurst CE Primary School, Salehurst 
Sandown Primary School, Hastings
Seaford Primary School, Seaford
Sedlescombe CE Primary School, Sedlescombe 
Shinewater Primary School, Langney
Silverdale Primary Academy, St Leonards-on-Sea
Sir Henry Fermor CE Primary School, Crowborough 
South Malling CE Primary School, Lewes 
Southover CE Primary School, Lewes
Stafford Junior School, Eastbourne
Staplecross Methodist Primary School, Staplecross
Stone Cross School, Stone Cross
Stonegate CE Primary School, Stonegate
Telscombe Cliffs Academy, Telscombe Cliffs
Ticehurst and Flimwell CE Primary School, Ticehurst 
Tollgate Community Junior School, Eastbourne 
Wadhurst CE Primary School, Wadhurst
Wallands Community Primary School, Lewes
West Rise Community Infant School, Langney 
West Rise Junior School, Langney
West St Leonard's Primary Academy, West St Leonards
Western Road Community Primary School, Lewes
Westfield School, Westfield
White House Academy, Hailsham
Willingdon Primary School, Willingdon
Wivelsfield Primary School, Wivelsfield

Secondary schools

Ark Alexandra Academy, Hastings
Beacon Academy, Crowborough
Bexhill High Academy, Bexhill-on-Sea
Causeway School, Eastbourne
The Cavendish School, Eastbourne
Chailey School, South Chailey
Claverham Community College, Battle
The Eastbourne Academy, Eastbourne
Gildredge House Free School, Eastbourne
Hailsham Community College, Hailsham
Hastings Academy, Hastings
Heathfield Community College, Heathfield
King's Academy, Ringmer
Peacehaven Community School, Peacehaven
Priory School, Lewes
Ratton School, Eastbourne
Robertsbridge Community College, Robertsbridge
Rye College, Rye
St Catherine's College, Eastbourne
The St Leonards Academy, St Leonards-on-Sea
St Richard's Catholic College, Bexhill-on-Sea
Seaford Head School, Seaford
Seahaven Academy, Newhaven
Uckfield College, Uckfield
Uplands Academy, Wadhurst
Willingdon Community School, Lower Willingdon

Special and alternative schools

College Central, Eastbourne
Cuckmere House School, Seaford
The Flagship School, Hastings
Glyne Gap School, Bexhill-on-Sea
Grove Park School, Crowborough
Hazel Court School, Eastbourne
The Lindfield School, Eastbourne
New Horizons School, St Leonards-on-Sea
The Ropemakers' Academy, Hailsham
St Mary's School, Horam
Saxon Mount School, St Leonards-on-Sea
The South Downs School, Eastbourne
Summerdown School, Eastbourne
Torfield School, Hastings
The Workplace, Bexhill-on-Sea

Further education
Bexhill College
Plumpton College
Sussex Coast College Hastings
Sussex Downs College

Independent schools

Primary and preparatory schools
Annan School, Framfield
Bede's School, Eastbourne
Sacred Heart School, Durgates
St Andrew's Prep, Eastbourne
Skippers Hill Manor Preparatory School, Five Ashes
Vinehall School, Robertsbridge

Senior and all-through schools

Battle Abbey School, Battle
Bede's School, Upper Dicker
Buckswood School, Guestling
Claremont School, Baldslow
Darvell School, Robertsbridge
Eastbourne College, Eastbourne
Greenfields School, Forest Row
Lewes Old Grammar School, Lewes
Mayfield School, Mayfield
Michael Hall School, Forest Row

Special and alternative schools

Anderida Learning Centre, Eastbourne
Chailey Heritage School, North Chailey
Compass Community School South, Newhaven
Frewen College, Northiam
Headstart, Ninfield
ISP School Battle, Battle
Mountfield Heath School, John's Cross
Northease Manor School, Rodmell
Owlswick School, Kingston
St John's School, Seaford
St Mary's School and 6th Form College, Bexhill-on-Sea
Step by Step School, Forest Row
VTSS, Cross-in-Hand

References

East Sussex

Lists of buildings and structures in East Sussex